
Gmina Bieżuń is an urban-rural gmina (administrative district) in Żuromin County, Masovian Voivodeship, in east-central Poland.

Villages
Apart from the town of Bieżuń, Gmina Bieżuń contains the villages and settlements of Adamowo, Bielawy Gołuskie, Borki, Dąbrówki, Dźwierzno, Gołuszyn, Karniszyn, Karniszyn-Parcele, Kobyla Łąka, Kobyla Łąka-Kolonia, Kocewko, Kocewo, Ludwinowo, Mak, Małocin, Marysin, Myślin, Pełki, Pozga, Sadłowo, Sadłowo-Parcele, Sławęcin, Stanisławowo, Stawiszyn-Łaziska, Stawiszyn-Zwalewo, Strzeszewo, Trzaski, Wieluń-Zalesie, Wilewo, Władysławowo and Zgliczyn-Pobodzy.

Neighbouring gminas
Gmina Bieżuń is bordered by the gminas of Lutocin, Radzanów, Rościszewo, Siemiątkowo, Szreńsk, Zawidz and Żuromin.

References
Polish official population figures 2006

Biezun
Żuromin County